The white-spotted flufftail (Sarothrura pulchra) is a species of bird in the family Sarothruridae.
It has a widespread range of presence across the African tropical rainforest.

References

white-spotted flufftail
Birds of the African tropical rainforest
white-spotted flufftail
white-spotted flufftail
Taxonomy articles created by Polbot